Henry Harrison ( – January 3, 1766) was a merchant and politician, and the mayor of Philadelphia, Pennsylvania, 1762–1763.

Early life

In his early life, he was captain of the ship The Snow Squirrel.

Career
After moving to the Province of Pennsylvania in what was then British America, Harrison served as an alderman. He was also a member and vestryman of Christ Church.  He became wealthy as a dry-goods merchant.

On October 5, 1762, he was appointed mayor of Philadelphia, serving until October 4, 1763.

He also served as manager of the Public Hospital and was a local real estate developer.

Personal life
On April 13, 1748, Harrison married Mary Aspden (1718–1803), formerly of Lancashire and the daughter of Mathew Aspen.  In 1760, he built a home in Philadelphia on Coombes Alley (today known as Cuthbert Street).  Together, they were the parents of five children:

 Mary Harrison (1750–1797), who married the Right Reverend William White, D.D., first consecrated Bishop of the Episcopal Church, Diocese of Philadelphia, in 1773.
 Anne Harrison (1757–1780), who married William Paca (1740–1799), signer of the Declaration of Independence and later governor of Maryland, on February 28, 1777.
 Matthias Harrison (1759–1817), who married Rebecca Mifflin, daughter of Turrut Francis.
 George Harrison (1762–1845) who married Sophia Francis in 1792.
 Joseph Harrison

Harrison died on January 3, 1766, in Philadelphia, where he was buried in Christ Church Burial Ground. His stone is inscribed "Alderman and sometime Mayor of Philadelphia, A Christian and useful Citizen. His desolate Widow, sadly bewailing her irretrievable loss, and striving to alleviate her grief with the memory of his worth, Erected this Stone."  His estate was estimated to be worth over £15,086.12.0 which included 157 troy ounces of plate valued at £78.10 (roughly $2,000,000 in 2017 figures).

References

1710s births
1766 deaths
Mayors of Philadelphia
Burials at Christ Church, Philadelphia
People of colonial Pennsylvania
Sailors from Lancashire
British emigrants to the Thirteen Colonies
Colonial American merchants